Aleksey Vasilyevich Baburin is a People's Deputy of Ukraine, and member of the 3rd, 4th, 5th and 6th Verkhovna Radas. He is a member of the Communist Party of Ukraine.

Biography 

Aleksey Baburin was born on January 11, 1949, in Vygonichi village of Vygonichsky District, Bryansk Oblast, Russian SFSR. In 1952, the family moved to Makiivka, Donetsk Oblast', Ukrainian SSR.

Education
 1971 – Dnipropetrovsk Chemical Technology Institute as chemical process engineer
 1991 – Kyiv Institute of Political and Social Management

Baburin served in the Soviet army 1971–1973.

Career
 October 1973 – foreman, than senior foreman, deputy galvanizing shop superintendent at Zaporizhzhia Automobile Plant; Deputy Secretary of Party Committee;
 1983–1991 – Secretary of the Party Committee
 1991 – Deputy Head of Department for logistics and maintenance, 1st Deputy business manager of Zaporizhzhia Automobile Plant
 1996–1998 –  1st Deputy business manager, Deputy Head, Head of the Department at JSC "AvtoZAZ"

In March 2006, he was elected the Deputy to Zaporizhzhia Oblast Council.

Verkhovna Rada
 March 1998 – April 2002 – People's Deputy of Ukraine in 3rd Verkhovna Rada, election district No. 75, Zaporizhzhia Oblast
 April 2002 – April 2006 – People's Deputy of Ukraine in 4th Verkhovna Rada, No. 23 in the list from the Communist Party of Ukraine
 April 2006 – November 2007 – People's Deputy of Ukraine in 5th Verkhovna Rada, № 21 in the list from the Communist Party
 November 2007 – December 2012 – People's Deputy of Ukraine in 6th Verkhovna Rada from the Communist Party, № 13 in the list

Baburin did not return to parliament after the 2012 Ukrainian parliamentary election after losing in single-member districts number 74 (first-past-the-post wins a parliament seat) located in Zaporizhzhia Oblast.

Family 
Aleksey Baburin is married, has two sons and a daughter.

See also 
 2007 Ukrainian parliamentary election
 List of Ukrainian Parliament Members 2007
 Verkhovna Rada

External links 
  Aleksey Baburin at Verkhovna Rada of Ukraine official web-site

References 

1949 births
Living people
People from Bryansk Oblast
Russian emigrants to Ukraine
Communist Party of Ukraine politicians
Third convocation members of the Verkhovna Rada
Fourth convocation members of the Verkhovna Rada
Fifth convocation members of the Verkhovna Rada
Sixth convocation members of the Verkhovna Rada